Yezupil is an urban-type settlement in western Ukraine. It is located in Ivano-Frankivsk Raion (district) of Ivano-Frankivsk Oblast (region), approximately 14 km north of the oblast capital, Ivano-Frankivsk. Yezupil hosts the administration of Yezupil settlement hromada, one of the hromadas of Ukraine. Population:

History
Yezupil was previously referred to as part of the Halych Powiat (county). It is also a part of the historic region of Pokuttya in Galicia.

At the turn of the century, town Jezupol (former Zhovten) was a fair size town (with its own Jewish Kahil and Roman Catholic Church and Greek Catholic Church) in Galicia/Halychyna in Austro-Hungarian Empire. 

It is approximately 7 km from Halych, the former capital of the Principality of Halych Volhynia in the 10/12th centuries. In 1352 – 1772 it was a part of Ruthenia Voivodeship in the Kingdom of Poland. First written in 1435. Up until the 16th century it was a village named Tzaishibesi, which had a wooden fortress. When the fort was destroyed during one of the Tatar incursions, Jakub Potocki, the voivode of Wroclaw and private owner of the town, renamed it Jesupol, after Jesus in 1597. In 1598, a fortress and Dominican monastery was erected, and the town developed next to it. The monastery had a rich and famous library of ancient scriptures and prints.

Upon the partition of the Polish–Lithuanian Commonwealth in 1772 the Kingdom of Galicia and Lodomeria, or simply Galicia, became the largest, most populous, and northernmost province of the Austrian Empire, where it remained until the dissolution of Austria-Hungary at the end of World War I.

In the prelude to the Second World War, the Molotov-Ribbentrop pact divided Poland roughly along the Curzon line. Thus, all territory east of the San, Bug and Neman rivers were annexed into the USSR, approximating the former territory of East Galicia. This territory was divided into four administrative districts (oblasts): Lvov, Stanislav, Drohobych and Tarnopol (the latter including parts of Volhynia) of the Ukrainian Soviet Socialist Republic. Since September 17, 1939, it was a part of the USSR. Since June 22, 1941, the Soviet regime discontinued when Germany had occupied East Galicia during Operation Barbarossa.

In 1945, the town became a part of the Ukrainian SSR as part of the Soviet Union; since 1991, the town has been a part of Ukraine. The first Jezupil (Jesupol) named town was renamed to Zhovten; it received the status of an urban-type settlement in 1940. On July 9, 2003, the town was officially renamed again to Jezupil.

Until 18 July 2020, Yezupil belonged tp Tysmenytsia Raion. The raion was abolished in July 2020 as part of the administrative reform of Ukraine, which reduced the number of raions of Ivano-Frankivsk Oblast to six. The area of Tysmenytsia Raion was merged into Ivano-Frankivsk Raion.

References

Geographic Library of the Kingdom of Poland (Polish language)

External links

wikimapia
Photographs of Jewish sites in Yezupil in Jewish History in Galicia and Bukovina
Yezupil's Music School, Yezupil's Music School

Urban-type settlements in Ivano-Frankivsk Raion
Populated places on the Dniester River in Ukraine